The 1958 Men's South American Volleyball Championship, was the 3rd edition of South American Men's Volleyball Championship, took place in 1958 in Porto Alegre.

Final positions

Mens South American Volleyball Championship, 1958
Men's South American Volleyball Championships
1958 in South American sport
1958 in Brazilian sport
International volleyball competitions hosted by Brazil